Boney Harold Watson (born March 26, 1978) is an American-Qatari basketball point guard. He was part of the Qatari team that won the 2013 FIBA Asia 3x3 Championship and 2014 FIBA 3x3 World Championships.

References

1978 births
Living people
Naturalised citizens of Qatar
American expatriate sportspeople in Qatar
People from Lake City, Florida
American men's basketball players
Qatari men's basketball players
Qatari people of African-American descent
Basketball players at the 2014 Asian Games
Point guards
Asian Games competitors for Qatar
African-American basketball players